Jean-Paul Tony Helissey (born 3 March 1990) is a French foil fencer. He won a silver medal in the team competition at the 2016 Summer Olympics.

References

External links

 Profile at the European Fencing Confederation

1990 births
Living people
Olympic fencers of France
Fencers at the 2016 Summer Olympics
French male foil fencers
Olympic medalists in fencing
Olympic silver medalists for France
Medalists at the 2016 Summer Olympics
Universiade medalists in fencing
Universiade bronze medalists for France
Fencers at the 2015 European Games
European Games medalists in fencing
European Games bronze medalists for France
Medalists at the 2013 Summer Universiade